The Antiguo Cuartel Militar Español de Ponce or "El Castillo" (English: Old Spanish Military Headquarters in Ponce or "The Castle") is the only structure directly related to the events of the land defense of Puerto Rico during the 1898 American invasion of the Island.  The historic building dates from 1894 and is located on Calle Castillo in Ponce, Puerto Rico, in the city's historic district. The structure was listed on the U.S. National Register of Historic Places on 14 May 1987.

History
"El Castillo", as this building is commonly known, was built in 1894 by the Spanish Royal Corps of Engineers as general headquarters for the Spanish military garrison stationed in Ponce. Since 1898, when Puerto Rico became a possession of the United States, this structure has served various purposes, first as courthouse and later as district jailhouse. It was being used as a district jail house in 1987.  In the late 1980s, it ceased to be used as a district jail, was reconditioned, and in 1992 it was inaugurated as the headquarters of the Ponce School of Fine Arts, which is its role.

The building was designed by the Spanish Royal Corps of Engineers. The architecture consists of 19th Century Civil Architecture. It is one of the largest Neoclassic Isabelino civil architecture structures built in Ponce during the 19th century. Its sober exterior walls help express its intended original use. The building played a significant role in law enforcement during the last years of the Spanish colonial rule for southern Puerto Rico and has played a significant role for both law enforcement and judicial purposes since then.

Significance
The Spanish garrison stationed in Ponce at the time of the arrival of the American troops in 1898 played a significant role in the defense of the island. While the Spanish commander in charge of the Ponce garrison had determined it was not possible to defend the city of Ponce from the American advance at the time, the Ponce troops, together with the aid of other smaller garrisons, held the Asomante area preventing the U.S. Army from invading Aibonito in their advance to the conquest of fortified areas of San Juan. The Ponce garrison also helped the Guayama garrison in its attempt to detain American troops from taking that city. "This is the only structure directly related to these [land] events that has been identified to date".

Description
The building consists of a two level square structure with an interior courtyard. It is built in brick and stone masonry; timber beams and brick layers were used for the roof and floors. The interior courtyard is surrounded by open-arched galleries in both levels. During the time when the building was being used as a district jail in 1987, the galleries provided the foundation of the jail barracks.

A repetition of windows over the facade's plane without any ornament gives the building an austere appearance, typical of military architecture developed during the Spanish period in Puerto Rico. The building still preserves its original lead gutters in the form of cannons. The building has been altered little since its original construction.  The most significant alteration has been the replacement of the original wooden louvers windows with metal louvered windows. Also, iron bars have been added to its interior openings. The building has also been upgraded in two rather minimal ways: the interior courtyard was repaved and modern sanitary facilities were installed.

See also
 Fuerte de San José

Notes

References

Further reading
 Cayetano Coll y Toste. Boletín Histórico de Puerto Rico. San Juan, Puerto Rico: Cantera Fernandez. 1914-1927.
 Salvador Brau. Historia de Ponce. 1913.
 Fay Fowlie de Flores. Ponce, Perla del Sur: Una Bibliográfica Anotada. Second Edition. 1997. Ponce, Puerto Rico: Universidad de Puerto Rico en Ponce. p. 26. Item 126. 
 "Edificios públicos de Ponce." Puerto Rico Ilustrado. 5 November 1938. p. 30. (Colegio Universitario Tecnológico de Ponce)

External links
 
 Escuela de Bellas Artes de Ponce
 Cuartel Militar Español in 1911, when it served as the Puerto Rico Court for the Ponce district Accessed 14 July 2020.

Government buildings completed in 1894
National Register of Historic Places in Ponce, Puerto Rico
Forts in Puerto Rico
Neoclassical architecture in Puerto Rico
Spanish Colonial architecture in Puerto Rico
1894 establishments in Puerto Rico
Forts on the National Register of Historic Places
Government buildings on the National Register of Historic Places in Puerto Rico